Omphalomia is a genus of snout moths described by Charles Swinhoe in 1894.

Species
Omphalomia accersita C. Swinhoe, 1894
Omphalomia hirta South, 1901

References

Pyralinae
Pyralidae genera